1st Turkmenevo (Russian: 1-е Туркменево; , 1-se Törökmän) is a rural locality (a selo) and the administrative centre of Mukasovsky Selsoviet, Baymaksky District, Russia. The population was 1043 as of 2010.

Geography 
1st Turkmenevo is located 59 km northeast of Baymak (the district's administrative centre) by road. Akhmerovo is the nearest rural locality.

Ethnicity 
The village is inhabited by Bashkirs.

Streets 
 Batyra Valida
 Buskun
 G. Suleimanova
 Gornaya
 Mira
 Molodezhnaya
 Peshiy Mahmut
 Salavata Yulaeva
 Taftizana Minigulova
 Tugazhman
 Tuyalyas
 Shaigita Hudaiberdina
 Shaizady Babicha
 Shkolnaya

References

External links 
 1st Turkemenevo on travellers.ru
 Historical information for the 1st Turkmenemeovo
 Council of Municipalities of the Republic of Bashkortostan

Rural localities in Baymaksky District